The river Eaulne is one of the rivers that flow from the plateau of the eastern Pays de Caux in the Seine-Maritime département of Normandy in northern France.

The Eaulne's source is at Mortemer. It then flows northwestwards through Sainte-Beuve-en-Rivière, Saint-Germain-sur-Eaulne, Londinières, Douvrend, Envermeu, turning westward at Bellengreville and on to Ancourt, Martin-Église and joins the river Arques at Arques-la-Bataille.

See also 
French water management scheme

References

Rivers of France
Rivers of Normandy
Rivers of Seine-Maritime